Arkab may refer to:

 Mohamed Arkab (born 1966), Algerian engineer and minister
 USS Arkab, a Crater-class cargo ship

See also
 Arkab Posterior, a star in the zodiac constellation of Sagittarius
 Arkab Prior,  a binary star system in the zodiac constellation of Sagittarius